Cat Simmons is an English actress, known for her role as DC Kezia Walker in the long-running ITV drama The Bill, and for starring in Family Affairs as Scarlett Anderson. She also played Sista Twista in Life and Lyrics. She also made appearances in No Angels and Casualty.

The daughter of a singer and nurse, her mother is English and her father is Guyanese.

Simmons trained with the Oldham Theatre Workshop and National Youth Music Theatre and studied at Pleckgate High School, Mathematics and Computing College.

Simmons has worked in numerous stage shows. Her work includes Nancy in Cameron Mackintosh's production of Oliver!, Mary Magdalene in Gale Edwards' Jesus Christ Superstar, the Young Vic's sell-out production of Langston Hughes' Simply Heavenly as Joyce, and the Princess in Aladdin alongside Ian McKellen.

In 2005, Simmons collaborated with music group Three Levels and released a track called "Rock U 2Nite".

Simmons returned to the Young Vic in summer 2009 to appear in Ché Walker's and Arthur Darvil's musical premiere of Been So Long with nu-classic soul singer Omar Lye-Fook. The production then toured to the Edinburgh Fringe Festival to showcase at the Traverse Theatre.

Simmons was cast as Nancy in the 2011-13 UK tour of Oliver!, in the place of Samantha Barks, who was cast as Eponine in the film Les Misérables. Simmons took the role from Birmingham in April 2012, and continued it through to October 2012, finishing in Newcastle.

In 2016 Simmons appeared as Clemmy Staples in the ITV series Midsomer Murders episode 18.4 "A Dying Art".

In 2018, Simmons was announced as part of the cast for the West End production of Come From Away.

Filmography

References

External links
 

Living people
English television actresses
English stage actresses
1981 births